The 1927 Ball Teachers Hoosieroons football team was an American football team that represented Ball Teachers College, sometimes referred to as Muncie Normal School (later renamed Ball State University), during the 1927 college football season. In its second and final season under head coach Norman G. Wann, the team compiled a 5–2–1 record and outscored opponents by a total of 151 to 108. The team played its home games at the North Walnut Street Ball Park in Muncie, Indiana.

The team's high scorer was Gerald "Jack" Liggett who played at both the halfback and fullback positions. Other players included Robert Walburn, George Smith, Maurice Mitchell, Robert Harper, Leonard Newman, Wayne Shields, Ivan Roetken, Herbert Faris, Robert Ziegler, James Leaky, and Earl Martin.

Coach Wann left the school in June 1928 in order to pursue a master's degree at the University of Wisconsin.  In two seasons under Wann, the Hoosieroons compiled a record of 10–3–2.

Schedule

References

Ball Teachers
Ball State Cardinals football seasons
Ball Teachers Hoosieroons football